Renate Piotraschke (born 1 October 1959) is a German diver. She competed in two events at the 1976 Summer Olympics.

References

External links
 

1959 births
Living people
German female divers
Olympic divers of West Germany
Divers at the 1976 Summer Olympics
People from Würselen
Sportspeople from Cologne (region)
20th-century German women